The Heathen Maiden is a rock formation that resembles a human face. It can be seen in the northern face of Mount Prisojnik near Kranjska Gora, in the Julian Alps in northwestern Slovenia. It is associated with a legend about a chamois known as Goldenhorn and a nymph (vila) dwelling in the mountain.

Legend

A nymph once foretold that a newborn would kill the chamois known as Goldenhorn. Upon hearing her prophecy, the other nymphs punished her by turning her into a rock.

Further reading
 Cerar-Drašler, Irena (2004): Pravljične poti Slovenije, Družinski izletniški vodnik, Sidarta, Ljubljana

References

External links

Rock formations of Slovenia
Julian Alps
Slovene mythology
Municipality of Kranjska Gora
Triglav National Park
Folklore of Upper Carniola